Goniobranchus woodwardae is a species of colourful sea slug, a dorid nudibranch, a marine gastropod mollusk in the family Chromodorididae.

Distribution
This marine species occurs off New South Wales, Australia.

Description
Goniobranchus woodwardae has a pale lilac mantle which grades to darker pink in some individuals. There are small to medium-sized red spots scattered over the mantle and a white band at the edge followed by a narrow yellow marginal band. Chromodoris thompsoni is very similar and this is one of a group of species in SE Australia which mimic each other in colour.

References

Chromodorididae
Gastropods described in 1983